Li Zewen (born 5 December 1973 in Qujing, Yunnan) is a retired Chinese race walker.

Achievements

References

1973 births
Living people
Athletes (track and field) at the 1996 Summer Olympics
Athletes (track and field) at the 1998 Asian Games
Chinese male racewalkers
Olympic athletes of China
People from Qujing
Asian Games medalists in athletics (track and field)
Athletes from Yunnan
Asian Games bronze medalists for China
Medalists at the 1998 Asian Games
World Athletics Race Walking Team Championships winners